Forcepia is a genus of sponges belonging to the family Coelosphaeridae.

The genus has cosmopolitan distribution.

Species

Species:

Forcepia acanthostylosa 
Forcepia agglutinans 
Forcepia apuliae

References

Sponges